The 2016–17 season is Zamalek's 58th season in the Egyptian Premier League and 58th consecutive season in the top flight of Egyptian football. The club will participate in the Premier League, Egypt Cup, Super Cup, and the CAF Champions League.

Team kit
The team kits for this season are manufactured by Joma.

Players

Transfers

Players in

Total expenditure: $? million

Players out

Total revenue:$?

Net income:  $?

Friendlies

Competitions

Overall

Overview
{| class="wikitable" style="text-align: center"
|-
!rowspan=2|Competition
!colspan=8|Record
|-
!
!
!
!
!
!
!
!
|-
| Premier League

|-
| Super Cup

|-
| Egypt Cup

|-
| Champions League

|-
! Total

Egyptian Premier League

Position

Results

Results summary

Results by matchday

Match details

2016 Egyptian Super Cup

2017 Egypt Cup

2017 CAF Champions League

First round

Zamalek won 5–3 on aggregate.

Group stage

2017 Arab Club Championship

Group B

References

Zamalek SC seasons
Zamalek